Spilosoma vagans, the wandering diacrisia or wandering tiger moth, is a moth in the family Erebidae. It was described by Jean Baptiste Boisduval in 1852. It is found in western North America, from southern California, southern Utah and central Colorado north to southern British Columbia and south-western Alberta. The habitat consists of drier forests, including open ponderosa pine forests and mixed hardwood-conifer forests.

The length of the forewings is 14–18 mm. The ground color of the wings ranges from light yellow brown with a salt-and-pepper dusting to ochre, bright orange brown, grey brown or dark reddish brown. Adults are on wing from late April to early August.

The larvae feed various herbaceous plants.

Subspecies
Spilosoma vagans vagans
Spilosoma vagans kasloa (Dyar, 1904)

References

Spilosoma vagans at BOLD
Spilosoma vagans at EOL
Spilosoma vagans at BHL

Moths described in 1852
vagans